This is the same as Gospel Book (British Library, Add MS 40618)

Add 40.618 is an Irish manuscript held in the British Museum. It contains the Gospels in the Vulgate.

References

 

Irish manuscripts
Early Irish literature
Texts of medieval Ireland
Irish-language literature
Táin Bó Cúailnge
Royal Irish Academy Library
Early medieval literature